A Man Among Men is a 1912 American silent film drama produced by Hardee Kirkland. The film stars Carl Winterhoff Adrienne Kroell. The film status is uncertain, but a release flier survives which is now at the Margaret Herrick Library at the Academy of Motion Pictures Arts and Sciences; it was part of the Charles G. Clarke collection. The film was distributed by the General Film Company and was released on November 18, 1912.

Plot
Steve Wilson (Carl Winterhoff), a wealthy automobile manufacturer, allows himself one per diversion-ministry to the poor in social settlements and public playgrounds. Through this association, he meets little Danny Smith (Timmy Sheehan), a six-year-old boy of remarkable precocity, who attracts his attention and admiration. Eventually, through the medium of Danny, he visits his home and meets his sister, Millie Smith (Adrienne Kroell), a girl just out of her teens who has much charm interests the wealthy man mightily. His administration has awakened into love when he learns from there that she is engaged to marry Bob Carson (Jack Nelson), a workman in his own shop, whose invention he thinks will make him wealthy. In reality, this invention is worthless, but Steve Wilson buys it, thus sacrificing himself for the love of the girl who has never realized his deep devotion.

Cast
 Carl Winterhoff - Steve Wilson, manager of an auto factory
 Adrienne Kroell - Millie Smith - a twenty year old poor girl
 Timmy Sheehan - Danny Smith, age six, her brother
 Olive Pringle - Dolly, Wilson's stenographer
 Jack Nelson - Bob Carson, a chauffeur, Millie's sweetheart
 Joseph Hazleton - auto factory superintendent, billed as Joe Hazleton

External links
 

1912 films
1912 drama films
American silent short films
1912 short films
Silent American drama films
American black-and-white films
1910s American films
1910s English-language films
English-language drama films
American drama short films